Electoral history of Harry S. Truman, who served as the 33rd president of the United States (1945–1953), the 34th vice president (1945), and as a United States senator from Missouri (1935–1945)

Electoral history prior to 1934

Before 1934, Truman ran four times for various administrative judgeships in Jackson County, Missouri.
 In 1922, Truman won the Democratic Party Primary election and general election for Eastern Judge of Jackson County.
 In 1924, Truman won the Democratic Party Primary election but lost the general election for Eastern Judge of Jackson County.
 In 1926, Truman won the Democratic Party Primary election and general election for Presiding Judge of Jackson County.
 In 1930, Truman won the Democratic Party Primary election and general election for Presiding Judge of Jackson County.

United States Senate races, 1934-1940

Democratic primary for the United States Senate from Missouri, 1934:
 Harry S. Truman - 276,850 (41.42%)
 John J. Cochran - 236,257 (35.35%)
 Jacob L. Milligan - 147,631 (22.09%)
 James Longstreet Cleveland - 7,691 (1.15%)

Missouri United States Senate election, 1934:
 Harry S. Truman (D) - 787,110 (59.55%)
 Roscoe C. Patterson (R) (inc.) - 524,954 (39.71%)
 W.C. Meyer (Socialist) - 9,010 (0.68%)
 Frank Brown (Communist) - 418 (0.03%)
 William Wesley Cox (Socialist Labor) - 384 (0.03%)

Democratic primary for the United States Senate from Missouri, 1940:
 Harry S. Truman (inc.) - 268,354 (40.91%)
 Lloyd Stark - 260,221 (39.67%)
 Maurice M. Milligan - 127,378 (19.42%)

Missouri United States Senate election, 1940:
 Harry S. Truman (D) (inc.) - 930,775 (51.17%)
 Manvel H. Davis (R) - 886,376 (48.73%)
 W. F. Rinck (Socialist) - 1,669 (0.09%)
 Theodore Baeff (Socialist Labor) - 196 (0.01%)

Vice presidential races, 1944

1944 Democratic National Convention (Vice Presidential tally):

1st ballot:
 Henry A. Wallace (inc.) - 429.5
 Harry S. Truman - 319.5
 John H. Bankhead II - 98
 Scott W. Lucas - 61
 Alben W. Barkley - 49.5
 J. Melville Broughton - 43
 Paul V. McNutt - 31
 Joseph C. O'Mahoney - 27
 Prentice Cooper - 26
 Robert S. Kerr - 23
 Scattering - 68.5

2nd ballot before shifts:
 Harry S. Truman - 477.5
 Henry A. Wallace (inc.) - 473
 Scott W. Lucas - 58
 Alben W. Barkley - 40
 J. Melville Broughton - 30
 Paul V. McNutt - 28
 Prentice Cooper - 26
 John H. Bankhead II - 23.5
 Joseph C. O'Mahoney - 8
 Robert S. Kerr - 1
 Scattering - 11

2nd ballot after shifts:
 Harry S. Truman - 1,031
 Henry A. Wallace - 105
 Prentice Cooper - 26
 Alben W. Barkley - 6
 Paul V. McNutt - 1
 Scatering - 7

1944 United States presidential election:

 Franklin D. Roosevelt/Harry S. Truman (D) - 25,612,916 (53.4%) and 432 electoral votes (81.36%, 36 states carried)
 Thomas E. Dewey/John W. Bricker (R) - 22,017,929 (45.9%) and 99 electoral votes (18.64%, 12 states carried)
 Texas Regulars - 135,439 (0.3%)
 Norman Thomas/Darlington Hoopes (Socialist) - 79,017 (0.2%)
 Claude Watson/Andrew Johnson (Prohibition) - 74,758 (0.2%)
 Others - 57,004 (0.1%)

Presidential races, 1948-1952

1948 Democratic presidential primaries:
 Harry S. Truman (inc.) - 1,419,875 (64.65%)
 William Alexander Julian - 271,146 (12.35%)
 Unpledged delegates - 161,629 (7.36%)
 Harley M. Kilgore - 157,102 (7.15%)
 W. B. Bixler - 136,401 (6.21%)
 Lynn Fellows - 11,193 (0.51%)
 Fred H. Hildebrandt - 8,016 (0.37%)
 Dwight D. Eisenhower - 6,211 (0.28%)
 Henry A. Wallace - 4,416 (0.20%)

1948 Democratic National Convention (Presidential tally):
 Harry S. Truman (inc.) - 926 (76.47%)
 Richard B. Russell - 266 (21.97%)
 James A. Roe - 15 (1.24%)
 Paul V. McNutt - 3 (0.25%)
 Alben W. Barkley - 1 (0.08%)

1948 United States presidential election:

 Harry S. Truman/Alben W. Barkley (D) - 24,179,347 (49.6%) and 303 electoral votes (57.06%, 28 states carried)
 Thomas E. Dewey/Earl Warren (R) - 21,991,292 (45.1%) and 189 electoral votes (35.59%, 16 states carried)
 Strom Thurmond/Fielding L. Wright (Dixiecrat) - 1,175,930 (2.4%) and 39 electoral votes (7.35%, 4 states carried)
 Henry A. Wallace/Glen H. Taylor (Progressive) - 1,157,328 (2.4%)
 Norman Thomas/Tucker P. Smith (Socialist) - 139,569 (0.3%)
 Claude Watson/Dale Learn (Prohibition) - 103,708 (0.2%)
 Others - 46,361 (0.1%)

1952 Democratic New Hampshire primary:
 Estes Kefauver - 19,800 (55.01%)
 Harry S. Truman (inc.) - 15,927 (44.25%)
 Douglas MacArthur - 151 (0.42%)
 Jim Farley - 77 (0.21%)
 Adlai Stevenson II - 40 (0.11%)

1952 Democratic presidential primaries:
 Estes Kefauver - 3,169,448 (65.04%)
 Pat Brown - 485,578 (9.97%)
 Richard B. Russell - 371,179 (7.62%)
 Matthew M. Neely - 191,471 (3.93%)
 Robert J. Bulkley - 184,880 (3.79%)
 Hubert Humphrey - 102,527 (2.10%)
 Adlai Stevenson II - 81,096 (1.66%)
 Dwight D. Eisenhower - 64,911 (1.33%)
 Harry S. Truman (inc.) - 62,345 (1.28%)
 Unpledged delegates - 46,361 (0.95%)
 Robert S. Kerr - 45,285 (0.93%)
 William O. Douglas - 29,532 (0.61%)
 W. Averell Harriman - 19,806 (0.41%)
 Jerome F. Fox - 18,322 (0.38%)

1952 Democratic National Convention (Presidential tally):

Most votes received by candidates for party presidential nomination, up to the point where a nominee was determined. Vote totals are rounded up to the next whole number.

 Adlai Stevenson II - 618 (37.36%)
 Estes Kefauver - 363 (21.95%)
 Richard B. Russell - 294 (17.78%)
 W. Averell Harriman - 124 (7.50%)
 Alben W. Barkley - 79 (4.78%)
 Robert S. Kerr - 65 (3.93%)
 Paul A. Dever - 38 (2.30%)
 Hubert Humphrey - 26 (1.57%)
 J. William Fulbright - 22 (1.33%)
 James E. Murray - 12 (0.73%)
 Harry S. Truman (inc.) - 6 (0.36%)
 Oscar R. Ewing - 4 (0.24%)
 Paul H. Douglas - 2 (0.12%)
 William O. Douglas - 1 (0.06%)

References

Harry S. Truman
Truman, Harry S.
Truman, Harry S.